The siege of Groningen may refer to one of several sieges:

 Siege of Groningen (1568) by Calvinist forces during the Eighty Years' War of 1568–1648
 Siege of Groningen (1580) by republican forces during the Eighty Years' War of 1568–1648
 Siege of Groningen (1594) by Dutch forces during the Eighty Years' War of 1568–1648
 Siege of Groningen (1672) by Prince-Bishopric forces of Münster during the Franco-Dutch War of 1672–1678